Jo Jo Gunne is the eponymous debut album from rock/hard rock band Jo Jo Gunne, formed after keyboardist/vocalist Jay Ferguson and bassist/vocalist Mark Andes left Spirit. "Run Run Run", released as the album's first single ("Shake That Fat" was the second), became a top 10 hit in the United Kingdom and received airplay on US AOR radio stations.

Track listing
All songs written by Jay Ferguson, except where noted.
"Run Run Run" (Ferguson, Matt Andes) 2:33
"Shake that Fat" (Ferguson, Matt Andes) 3:44
"Babylon" 4:05
"I Make Love" 2:54
"Barstow Blue Eyes" 3:18
"99 Days" 3:20
"Academy Award" 4:58
"Take it Easy" (Ferguson, Matt Andes) 4:47
"Flying Home" 3:12

Charts

Personnel
Jo Jo Gunne
Jay Ferguson – lead vocals, keyboards
Matthew "Matt" Andes – guitars, backing vocals
Mark Andes – bass, backing vocals
William "Curly" Smith – drums, backing vocals, percussion, harmonica

Production
Arranged by Jo Jo Gunne
Produced by Jo Jo Gunne, with additional production by Tom Dowd
Recorded and mixed by Chris Hinshaw
Remixed by Tom Dowd
All songs published by Hollenbeck Music, except tracks 1, 2 and 8 (Hollenbeck Music/Bulge Music)

References 

1972 debut albums
Asylum Records albums
Albums produced by Tom Dowd